Bolton West is a constituency represented in the House of Commons of the UK Parliament since 2015 by Chris Green, a Conservative.

Constituency profile
The seat is on the outskirts of Greater Manchester with fields making for separate villages and towns, these buffer zones most often designated as Green belt, which includes areas for sport such as the ground of Bolton Wanderers at the University of Bolton Stadium. It includes the generally affluent towns of Blackrod, Horwich and Westhoughton in the western half of Bolton borough though in 2010 Atherton from the Wigan borough was added, a more Labour-leaning former coal mining town. To date the seat has been a marginal seat between the Labour and the Conservative parties, however as of the 2019 election, it is also the safest Conservative seat in Greater Manchester, with a larger majority than Altrincham and Sale West.

Boundaries

1950–1983: The County Borough of Bolton wards of Deane-cum-Lostock, Derby, Halliwell, Heaton, Rumworth, Smithills, and West.

1983–1997: The Borough of Bolton wards of Blackrod, Deane-cum-Heaton, Halliwell, Horwich, Hulton Park, Smithills, and Westhoughton.

1997–2010: The Borough of Bolton wards of Blackrod, Deane-cum-Heaton, Horwich, Hulton Park, Smithills, and Westhoughton.

2010–present: The Borough of Bolton wards of Halliwell, Heaton and Lostock, Horwich and Blackrod, Horwich North East, Smithills, Deane  Westhoughton North and Chew Moor, and Westhoughton South, and the Borough of Wigan ward of Atherton.

There were major boundary changes to Bolton West in 1983 when part of its area went to create Bolton North East, but compensated by taking most of the former Westhoughton constituency. 2010 saw the town of Atherton added from the Wigan borough, previously in the Leigh constituency. It is the only part of the Wigan borough not represented by a constituency fully within Wigan borough.

Members of Parliament

Elections

Elections in the 2010s

Elections in the 2000s

Elections in the 1990s

Elections in the 1980s

Elections in the 1970s

Elections in the 1960s

Elections in the 1950s

See also
 List of parliamentary constituencies in Greater Manchester

Notes

References

External links 
 nomis Constituency Profile for Bolton West — presenting data from the ONS annual population survey and other official statistics.

Parliamentary constituencies in Greater Manchester
Politics of the Metropolitan Borough of Bolton
Constituencies of the Parliament of the United Kingdom established in 1950
Parliamentary constituencies in North West England